The national flag of Belgium is a tricolour consisting of three equal vertical bands displaying the national colours of Belgium: black, yellow, and red. The colours were taken from the coat of arms of the Duchy of Brabant, and the vertical design may be based on the flag of France. When flown, the black band is nearest the pole (at the hoist side). It has the unusual proportions of 1315.

In 1830, the flag, at that time non-officially, consisted of three horizontal bands, with the colors red, yellow and black. On 23 January 1831, the National Congress enshrined the tricolor in the Constitution, but did not determine the direction and order of the color bands. As a result, the "official" flag was given vertical stripes with the colors black, yellow and red.

Previous flags
After the death of Charlemagne, the present-day territory of Belgium (except the County of Flanders) became part of Lotharingia, which had a flag of two horizontal red stripes separated by a white stripe. The territory then passed into Spanish hands, and after the coronation of Charles V, Holy Roman Emperor, yellow and red, the colours of Spain, were added. From the 16th century to the end of the 18th century, the colours of what is now Belgium were red, white and yellow. Occasionally, the red Cross of Burgundy was placed on the white section of the flag.

During the period of Austrian rule, a number of different flags were tried. Eventually, the Austrian emperor imposed the Austrian flag. The population of Brussels was opposed to this, and, following the example of France, red, yellow and black cockades began to appear, those being the colours of Brabant. The colours thus correspond to the red lion of Hainaut, Limburg and Luxembourg, the yellow lion of Brabant, and the black lion of Flanders and Namur.

Independence and adoption of current flag

On 26 August 1830, the day after the rioting at the La Monnaie opera house and the start of the Belgian Revolution, the flag of France flew from the city hall of Brussels. The insurgents hastily replaced it with a tricolour of red, yellow, and black horizontal stripes (similar to the one used during the Brabant Revolution of 1789–1790 which had established the United States of Belgium) made at a nearby fabric store. As a result, Article 193 of the Constitution of Belgium describes the colours of the Belgian nation as Red, Yellow, and Black, the reverse order shown in the official flag.

On 23 January 1831, the stripes changed from horizontal to vertical, and on 12 October, the flag attained its modern form, with the black placed at the hoist side of the flag.

Design and specifications
Each of the stripes is one-third of the width of the flag. The yellow is in fact yellow and not the darker gold of the flag of Germany, which is a black-red-gold tricolour, striped horizontally.

Variants

National flag and civil ensign
The national flag has the unusual proportions of 13:15.
The 2:3 flag is the civil ensign, the correct flag for use by civilians at sea.

Naval ensign and jack
The naval ensign of Belgium has the three national colours in a saltire, on a white field, with a black crown above crossed cannons at the top and a black anchor at the bottom. It was created in 1950, shortly after the Belgian Navy was re-established, having been a section of the British Royal Navy during World War II, and it is reminiscent of the White Ensign of the Royal Navy.

There is also an official Belgian naval jack, which is the same as the national flag, except in a 1:1 ratio, making it square.

Royal standard and flags on the royal palaces
The royal standard of Belgium is the personal standard of the current king, Philippe, and features his monogram, an 'F' (for the Dutch 'Filip'), crossed with a 'P' in the four corners. The designs of royal standards of past monarchs have been similar.

Notably, the flag of Belgium flown on the Royal Palace of Brussels and the Royal Castle of Laeken is in none of the proportions above. It has the irregular 4:3 ratio, making it taller than it is wide. The stripes remain vertical. These proportions are explained as an aesthetic consideration, as the palaces are large, and the flags are thus viewed from far below, which makes them look more normal due to foreshortening.

The flags are flown above the palaces when the monarch is in Belgium, not necessarily just in one of the palaces. The flags are not flown if the monarch is on a state visit overseas or on holiday outside of Belgium. There have been exceptions to this rule, but, in general, presence or absence of the flag is a reasonably reliable indicator of whether or not the monarch is in the country.

Protocol

As Belgium is a federal state, the flag of Belgium and the flags of the communities or regions in principle occupy the same rank. Nonetheless, when flags are raised and lowered or carried in a procession, the national flag takes precedence over all the others.

The order of precedence is:
The national flag of Belgium
The flag of the community or region of Belgium
The European Flag
The flags of the provinces of Belgium, in alphabetical order in the local language, if more than one is flown
The flag of the municipality

If there is a visiting head of state, that country's flag may be set second in precedence, all other flags dropping a rank.

See also

 List of Belgian flags
 Flag of Flanders
 Flag of Wallonia
 Flag of Brussels
 Driekleur trikot
 Coat of arms of Belgium

References

External links

 
Belgium
National symbols of Belgium
Belgium